The following is a list of rock types recognized by geologists. There is no agreed number of specific types of rocks. Any unique combination of chemical composition, mineralogy, grain size, texture, or other distinguishing characteristics can describe a rock type. Additionally, different classification systems exist for each major type of rock. There are three major types of rock: igneous rock, metamorphic rock, and sedimentary rock.

Igneous rocks

 
  
 
 
 
 
 – Basaltic lava with a crumpled appearance
  – Basaltic lava with a flowing, often ropy appearance
  
 
 
 
  
 
 
  
 
 
 
 
 
 
 
  
 
  
 
 
 
 
 
 
 
  
  
 
 
  – An ultramafic, ultrapotassic intrusive rock dominated by mafic phenocrysts in a feldspar groundmass
  – A silica-undersaturated form of andesite
  – An ultramafic rock, essentially a peridotite
  – A silica-undersaturated granite with <5% normative quartz
  – a plutonic rock with <5% normative quartz
  – A silica-undersaturated plutonic rock of nepheline and alkali feldspar
  – A silica-undersaturated plutonic rock with >90% nepheline
  – A hypersthene-bearing gabbro
  
 
  
  – A silica-undersaturated volcanic rock; essentially similar to nepheline syenite
  – A volcanic rock with a composition between phonolite and tephrite
  – An olivine-bearing basalt
 
  
  - a coarse grained plutonic rock composed of >90% pyroxene
  – A diorite with >5% modal quartz
  – An intermediate plutonic rock, essentially a monzonite with 5–10% modal quartz
  – An intrusive rock composed mostly of quartz
  – A felsic volcanic rock which is intermediate between a rhyolite and a dacite
 
 
 
 
  – a plutonic rock
  – A coarse-grained carbonatite rock
  – A plutonic rock dominated by orthoclase feldspar; a type of granitoid
  – Essentially a basaltic glass
  – A volcanic rock with a composition between phonotephrite and phonolite
  – A silica-undersaturated volcanic rock
  – A plagioclase-dominant granitoid
  – An alkaline intermediate volcanic rock
 - sodic trachyandesite
  – A volcanic rock with a composition between basalt and trachyte
 – a sodic type of trachybasalt, typically formed by ocean island (hot spot) volcanism
  – A silica-undersaturated volcanic rock; essentially a feldspathoid-bearing rhyolite
  – A plutonic ultramafic rock containing olivine, pyroxene and plagioclase
  – A form of tonalite where plagioclase-group feldspar is oligoclase
  
  – A type of pyroxenite, composed of clinoproxene and orthopyroxene
  - An ultramafic plutonic or cumulate rock, a type of peridotite, composed of olivine and clinopyroxene

Sedimentary rocks

 
  
 
 
 
 
  
 
  
 
  
  
  
  
 
 
 
 
 
 
  
  
 
  
 
 
 
  
  – A non-detrital sedimentary rock that contains high amounts of phosphate minerals

Metamorphic rocks

 
 
 
  – A rock formed by faulting
 
  
 
  – A mafic metamorphic rock dominated by green amphiboles
 
 – A type of hornfels found in the Scottish Highlands
  – Nepheline syenite gneiss
  – a metamorphosed limestone
 
  – A metamorphic rock formed by shearing
  – A metamorphic rock with a protolith of clay-rich (siltstone) sedimentary rock
 Metapsammite – A metamorphic rock with a protolith of quartz-rich (sandstone) sedimentary rock
  – A low grade metamorphic rock composed mostly of micaceous minerals
  – A glass formed by melting within a fault via friction
  – A metamorphosed sandstone typically composed of >95% quartz
 
 
 
  - A low grade metamorphic rock formed from shale or silts
  – A rock formed by partial melting during a meteorite impact
  – A metamorphosed ultramafic rock with talc as an essential constituent; similar to a serpentinite
 – Essentially a talc schist
  – A rock whose fabric reflects the history of its deformation
  – A high pressure metamorphic rock containing talc and kyanite

Specific varieties  
The following are terms for rocks that are not petrographically or genetically distinct but are defined according to various other criteria; most are specific classes of other rocks, or altered versions of existing rocks. Some archaic and vernacular terms for rocks are also included.

  – A variety of quartz monzonite
  – A group of varieties of lamprophyre, mostly rich in hornblende
 
  – A variety of nepheline syenite from Loch Borralan, Scotland
 
 
 
 
  
 
 
  
  
  – A hematite-silica metasomatite analogous to a skarn
  - A variety of phonolite, first found on Mount Kenya 
  - A rock composed of lazurite and other minerals
 
  – A metamorphosed nepheline syenite occurrence near Litchfield, Maine
  – A hypabyssal rhyolite with microcline and blue quartz phenocrysts from the Llano Uplift in Texas
 
 
 Minette – A variety of lamprophyre
  – A type of chert found in Oklahoma, Arkansas, and Texas
  
  – A chemical analogue considered to theoretically represent the earth's upper mantle
 
  – A type of latite with euhedral rhombic phenocrysts of feldspar
  – A mafic rock metasomatized by serpentinization fluids
  – melitilic and kalsititic rocks
  
  
  – A silica undersaturated, analcime bearing gabbro
  – A nepheline gabbro
  – An altered granite
 
  – A variety of lamprophyre
  – A rock rich in manganese oxide or manganese hydroxide

See also 

 
 
 
 : for a list of unusual or culturally significant rock outcrops

References

External links 
 British Geological Survey rock classification scheme
 Igneous rock classification 
 Rock Types Article by Encyclopædia Britannica
 Classification of common rocks and soils
 Metamorphic Rock Classification
 Volcanic rocks
 Earth Science Education Unit virtual rock kit

Rocks
Rocks
 Type
Rocks
Rocks
Rocks